Krokowo may refer to the following places:
Krokowo, Nidzica County in Warmian-Masurian Voivodeship (north Poland)
Krokowo, Olsztyn County in Warmian-Masurian Voivodeship (north Poland)
Krokowo, West Pomeranian Voivodeship (north-west Poland)